Saleh Ra'fat is a member of the executive committee of the Palestinian Liberation Organisation.

References

Palestine Liberation Organization members
Living people
People from Arraba, Jenin
Year of birth missing (living people)
Place of birth missing (living people)
Members of the Executive Committee of the Palestine Liberation Organization